The 1988 Panasonic Cup was the 15th edition of the NSWRL Midweek Cup, a NSWRL-organised national club Rugby League tournament between the leading clubs and representative teams from the NSWRL, the BRL, the CRL and Papua New Guinea.

A total of 19 teams from across Australia and Papua New Guinea played 18 matches in a straight knock-out format, with the matches being held midweek during the premiership season.

Qualified Teams

Venues

Preliminary round

Round 1

Quarter finals

Semi finals

Final

Teams
St. George : 
1. Clinton Mohr, 2. Bert Gordon, 3. Brian Johnston, 4. Michael Beattie, 5. Ricky Walford, 6. Steve Robinson, 7. Brett Clark, 8. Peter Gill, 9. Graeme Wynn, 10. Wally Fullerton-Smith, 11. Craig Young, 12. Trevor Bailey, 13. Paul Osborne Reserves 14. Darren Higgins, 15. Colin Fraser, 16. Geoff Selby, 17. Mark Blackburn. Coach: Ted Glossop.

Balmain : 
1. Garry Jack, 2. Clint Robinson, 3. Russel Gartner, 4. Matt Parish, 5. John Davidson, 6. Ross Conlon, 7. Michael Neil, 8. Wayne Pearce, 9. David Brooks, 10. Paul Sironen, 11. Steve Roach, 12. Ben Elias, 13. Bruce McGuire Reserves 14. Michael Moss, 15. Peter Camroux, 16. Kevin Hardwick, 17. Steve Edmed. Coach: Warren Ryan.

Player of the Series
 Peter Gill (St. George)

Golden Try
 Sandy Campbell (Canterbury-Bankstown)

Sources
http://users.hunterlink.net.au/~maajjs/aus/nsw/sum/nsw1988.htm

1988
1988 in Australian rugby league